The M12 Motorway, initially known as Western Sydney Airport Motorway, is an under-construction east-west motorway in Sydney, Australia, linking between the M7 Motorway and The Northern Road, as part of the Western Sydney Infrastructure Plan. The four-lane motorway is planned to be 14 km long and to be built at a cost of $1.75 billion (with both State and Federal funding). It is aimed at providing direct access from the M7 Westlink Motorway to the new Western Sydney Airport situated at Badgerys Creek.

The motorway began construction in August 2022 and is expected to open prior to the Western Sydney Airport opening in 2026.

Alignment
The M12 Motorway will run between M7 Motorway and The Northern Road, including an exit to the access road towards the Western Sydney Airport. The motorway will have 4 lanes, with provision to be widened to 6 lanes. It will also be toll-free.

Elizabeth Drive 
The existing road, Elizabeth Drive, is a two lane, single carriageway road linking the Hume Highway at Liverpool, with The Northern Road at Luddenham. It is one of several key thoroughfares in Western Sydney. The new motorway will run parallel to Elizabeth Drive.

History

Planning
On 17 June 2014, as part of the State Budget, the NSW Government announced a $5.5 billion road package for Western Sydney. It included $6 million for planning the Western Sydney Airport Motorway. The Budget was also the first time the name of the motorway was referred to. However, in recent years, government media and press releases simply refer to it as M12 Motorway.

The project was granted planning approval in April 2021.

Construction
Major construction is proposed to commence in 2022 and is expected to be completed prior to the Western Sydney Airport opening in December 2026.

The construction of the motorway was split into three sections. In June 2020, the companies shortlisted to build two of the three sections were announced:
 west section including the connection to the airport: Acciona, Fulton Hogan, and CPB Georgiou Group joint venture
 central section from west of South Creek to Duff Road: CPB Georgiou Group joint venture, and Seymour Whyte

In May 2022, Seymour Whyte and CPB Georgiou Group joint venture were announced as the contractors for the central and west sections respectively. Procurement of the east section (connection with Elizabeth Drive and the M7) will occur later in the same year.

Construction began in August 2022 on the west and central sections.

References

External links
M12 Motorway project page
Project's Environmental Impact Statement (EIS) - Major Projects Portal

Proposed roads in Australia
Highways in Sydney
Western Sydney